Stadio Comunale Pasqualino Ferrante di Piedimonte Matese, shortened to Stadio Pasqualino Ferrante and known locally as simply Stadio di Sepicciano is a municipal stadium in Sepicciano, a frazione of Piedimonte Matese, Italy. It has served as the home venue of Eccellenza Molise club Tre Pini Matese, Promozione Molise club F.W.P. Matese and Femminile Reg. Calcio 5 club Tre Pini Matese Femminile. It is currently the home ground of Serie D (Group F) side F.C. Matese.

History 
The stadium, known today as "Stadio Pasqualino Ferrante", was built sometime during the early 20th century and played host to original tenants Pro Piedimonte (founded in 1928). Murals of past players and staff adorn the exterior walls of the stadium. In addition to championing the club's accomplishments, there is a separate mural dedicated to the country itself, celebrating the nation's footballing achievements at FIFA's 1934 (Italy), 1938 (France), 1982 (Spain), and 2006 (Germany) World Cups.

2012, the Stadio Comunale Pasqualino Ferrante 
In 2012, Stadio Comunale was renamed 'Stadio Comunale Pasqualino Ferrante di Piedimonte Matese'; to honour the town's municipal councillor, Pasqualino Ferrante.

The stadium's occupants from 2012 to 2020 were Tre Pini Matese; and F.W.P. Matese from 2013 to 2020. In addition to the men's team, the stadium hosted women's matches for Tre Pini Matese Femminile.

References

External links 
 Città di Piedimonte Matese 
 Ufficio Comunicazioni Sociali Diocesi di Alife-Caiazzo 
 PIEDIMONTE, CASERTANA E TRE PINI INAUGURANO IL NUOVO TAPPETO VERDE DEL FERRANTE 

Stadio Pasqualino Ferrante
Piedimonte Matese
Sport in Campania
Province of Benevento
Province of Caserta